Chwiszczej is a river of Poland, a tributary of the Leśna Prawa in the Białowieża Forest.

Rivers of Poland
Rivers of Podlaskie Voivodeship